Claes Phillip Kronberg (né Jørgensen) (born 19 April 1987) is a Danish footballer who plays as a full-back for KÍ Klaksvík.

Career
Kronberg was born on Falster where he also played for Nykøbing FC. 
Kronberg joined Sarpsborg 08 in 2011. He made his debut for Sarpsborg 08 in a 3-1 loss against Lillestrøm.

In July 2013 he changed his surname to Kronberg after he married his girlfriend.

Kronberg joined Viking ahead of the 2016 season. After the 2018 season, Viking did not renew Kronberg's contract and thus he left the club.

On 19 June 2019, Kronberg signed for Sandnes Ulf after training with them for several months. He made his debut for the club the same day when Sandnes Ulf lost 1–2 against his former club Viking in the third round of the 2019 Norwegian Cup.

Career statistics

References

External links

1987 births
Living people
Danish men's footballers
Sarpsborg 08 FF players
Viking FK players
Sandnes Ulf players
KÍ Klaksvík players
Eliteserien players
Norwegian First Division players
Faroe Islands Premier League players
Danish expatriate men's footballers
Expatriate footballers in Norway
Danish expatriate sportspeople in Norway
Association football midfielders
People from Falster